Vincent Mar Paulos (born 20 February 1964) is the Metropolitan Bishop of the Syro-Malankara Catholic Eparchy of Marthandom.

Early life 

He was born on 20 February 1964 in Kumarankudy Village near Thiruvattar in the District of Kanyakumari in the state of Tamil Nadu. He belongs to the Eparchy of Marthandom. His parents are Kochupillai and Maria Thangam.

Ministry 

He was ordained priest at his home parish Annakarai on 2 January 1991 by Benedict Mar Gregorios.

References 

 About Vincent Mar Paulos
 [Installation of Most Reverend Dr. Vincent Mar Pauloes]

1964 births
Living people
21st-century Eastern Catholic bishops
Metropolitan bishops
Syro-Malankara bishops
People from Kanyakumari district